The 1980 Rhode Island Rams football team was an American football team that represented the University of Rhode Island in the Yankee Conference during the 1980 NCAA Division I-AA football season. In their fifth season under head coach Bob Griffin, the Rams compiled a 2–9 record (0–5 against conference opponents) and finished last in the conference.

Schedule

References

Rhode Island
Rhode Island Rams football seasons
1980 in sports in Rhode Island